Gladstone Park is a station on Metra's Union Pacific Northwest Line located in the Gladstone Park neighborhood of Chicago, Illinois. Gladstone Park primarily serves rush hour trains and is closed on weekends and holidays. The station is located at 5500 N. Austin Avenue, adjacent to the Kennedy Expressway.

As of April 25, 2022, Gladstone Park is served by 17 trains (eight inbound, nine outbound) on weekdays only.

Gladstone Park is located at grade level and is the first station northbound after the Northwest Line descends to grade level. Gladstone Park has two platforms which serve three tracks. There is no ticket agent at Gladstone Park, so tickets must be purchased on board the train. A footbridge is located south of the station to allow passengers (and neighboring pedestrians) to cross the Kennedy Expressway. Gladstone Park is one of two stations on the UP-Northwest line that is not ADA-accessible, the other being .

CTA Bus Connections
  68 Northwest Highway

References

External links

Metra stations in Chicago
Former Chicago and North Western Railway stations